The Legend of Beaver Dam is a Canadian musical comedy horror short film, directed by Jerome Sable and released in 2010. The film stars L. J. Benet as Danny Zigwitz, a nerdy young boy at summer camp who is called on to save his friends when the camp counsellor's (Seán Cullen) campfire song about a monster named Stumpy Sam awakens the eponymous bloodthirsty beast (Rick Miller).

The film premiered at the 2010 Toronto International Film Festival, and was named to TIFF's year-end Canada's Top Ten list for 2010. It was subsequently screened at the 2011 Sundance Film Festival, where it received an honorable mention in the short films category.

References

External links

2010 films
2010 short films
Canadian comedy horror films
Canadian musical comedy films
Canadian horror short films
2010s English-language films
Canadian comedy short films
2010s Canadian films